Eion was a town in ancient Pieria.

Its site is unlocated.

References

Populated places in ancient Macedonia
Former populated places in Greece
Lost ancient cities and towns
Geography of ancient Pieria